The Ministry of Finance of Honduras is responsible for the public finance policies of Honduras. The ministry was created after the first constitution of Honduras was adopted in 1825.

Ministers of Finance
Casto Alvarado, ?-1841-1847
José María Rojas, 1848-1849
José María Rugama, 1850
José Antonio Milla, 1852-1854
José María Cacho, 1854-1855
José María Rojas, 1856-1858
Florencio Xatruch, 1858-1859
Pedro Alvarado, 1859-1860
Manuel Colindres, 1860-1862
Coronado Chávez, 1862
Lucas Ríos, 1862
Francisco Alvarado, 1862
José Meza, 1863-1864
Pedro Alvarado, 1864
Mariano Alvarez, 1865
Saturnino Bográn, 1865
Crescencio Gomez, 1865
Saturnino Bográn, 1866-1868
José María Rojas, 1868-1869
Francisco Alvarado, 1869-1870
Carlos Madrid, 1870
Marcial Vijil, 1871
José María Bustamante, 1871
Rafael Padilla, 1871
Juan N. Venero, 1872
Mariano Rubi, 1873
Esteban Ferrari, ?-1875
Francisco Alvarado, 1875-1876
Abelardo R. Zelaya, 1880
Miguel R. Dávila, 1898
José M. Muñoz, 1898
Camilo F. Duron, 1902
D. Fortín H., 1903
Saturnino Medal, 1904
Silverio Lainez, 1924
Ramón Alcerro Castro, 1929-?
Julio Lozano Díaz, 1934-1936
Armando Flores F., 1936
Héctor Caraccioli, 1936-1937
Urbano Quezada, 1943-1946
Marco Antonio Batres, 1949-1954
Pedro Pineda Madrid, 1955-1957
Gabriel Mejia, 1957
Jacinto Duron, 1957
Marco Antonio Batres, 1957-1958
Fernando Villar, 1958-1959
Jorge Bueso Arias, 1959-1963
Edgardo Dumas Rodríguez, 1963-1964
Tomas Cáliz Moncada, 1964-1965
Manuel Acosta Bonilla, 1965-1970
Elio Ynestroza Moncada, 1971-1972
Manuel Acosta Bonilla, 1973-1975
Porfirio Zavala Sandoval, 1975-1978
Rene Pineda Mejia, 1978
Valentin Mendoza, 1979-1981
Benjamin Villanueva Tabora, 1981-1982
Arturo Corleto Moreira, 1982-1984
Manuel Fontecha Ferrari, 1984-1985
Rodolfo Matamoros Hernández, 1985-1986
Efraín Bu Girón, 1986-1989
Carlos Falk, 1989
Benjamin Villanueva Tabora, 1990-1993
René Ardón Matute, 1993-1994
Juan Francisco Ferrera López, 1994-1998
Gabriela Núñez, January 1998-January 2002
José Arturo Alvarado, 2002-2004
William Chong Wong, 2004-2006
Hugo Noé Pino, 2006
Rebeca Santos, July 2006-June 2009
Gabriela Núñez, 2009-2010
William Chong Wong, 2010-2012
Héctor Guillén, 2012
Wilfredo Cerrato, 2012-2018
Rocío Tábora, 2018-2020
Marco Midence, 2020-2021
Luis Fernando Mata, 2021-2022
Rixi Moncada, 2022-
Source:

See also 
 Finance ministry
 Economy of Honduras
 Government of Honduras

References

External links
Homepage of the ministry

Honduras
Government of Honduras
1825 establishments in Honduras